Live is the first live album by Serbian and former Yugoslav rock band YU Grupa.

Although the band previously appeared on various artists live albums Kongres rock majstora (1975) and Legende YU Rocka (1988), Live is their first official live album. The first ten tracks on the album were recorded on the band's concert in Dom Omladine in Belgrade, in December 2005, while the last six tracks were recorded on the band's unplugged concert in Studio M in Novi Sad, in January 1996.

Track listing
"Moj stari bend" – 3:30
"Gledaj samo pravo" – 4:33
"Dunavom šibaju vetrovi" – 5:03
"Zamoliću te" – 4:19
"Opasno, opasno te volim" – 4:17
"U tami disko kluba" – 3:40
"Crni leptir" – 5:15
"Od zlata jabuka" – 3:45
"Pustinja" – 3:25
"Mornar" – 4:38
"Oluja" – 6:11
"More" – 6:13
"Ruža vetrova" – 4:16
"Reka" – 5:04
"Blok" – 3:19
"Čudna šuma" – 5:28

Personnel

Dom Omladine
Dragi Jelić - vocals, guitar
Žika Jelić - vocals, bass guitar
Petar Jelić - guitar, backing vocals
Igor Malešević - drums

Guest musicians
Kornelije Kovač - keyboards
Goca Svilarević - backing vocals
Mirjana Jovanović - backing vocals

Unplugged
Dragi Jelić - vocals, guitar
Žika Jelić - vocals, bass guitar
Petar Jelić - guitar, backing vocals
Ratislav Đelmaš - drums

Guest musicians
Kornelije Kovač - keyboards
Ceca Slavković - backing vocals
Goca Svilarević - backing vocals
Nenad Januzović - percussion
Uroš Šećerov - percussion
Gabor Bunford - saxophone
Vladimir Nežić - trombone
Zoltan Hegediš - trumpet
Dragan Kozarčić - trumpet

References 
 EX YU ROCK enciklopedija 1960-2006,  Janjatović Petar;  

2007 live albums
PGP-RTS live albums
YU Grupa live albums